Grevillea variifolia, commonly known as the Cape Range grevillea, is a shrub of the genus Grevillea native to an area in the Gascoyne region of Western Australia.<ref name=FB>{{FloraBase|name=Grevillea variifolia|id=2117}}</ref>

Description
It blooms between June and October and produces an axillary or terminal raceme irregular inflorescence with red flowers with red styles.

Taxonomy
The species was first formally described by the botanists Charles Austin Gardner and Alex George in 1963 as a part of the work Eight new plants from Western Australia as published in the Journal of the Royal Society of Western Australia.
There are two recognised subspecies:
 Grevillea variifolia subsp. bundera Grevillea variifolia subsp. varifolia''

Distribution
The species grows amongst medium to low trees in scrubland and on spinifex grassland is found from Cape Range as far east as Lake McLeod. In grows in rocky, gravelly, sandy or loamy soils often over limestone.

Cultivation
The species is sold commercially and grows well in a sunny and well drained position. It is suitable for landscaping with the silvery leaves and interesting shaped right red flowers. It is both drought and frost resistant.

See also
 List of Grevillea species

References

variifolia
Proteales of Australia
Eudicots of Western Australia
Taxa named by Charles Gardner
Taxa named by Alex George
Plants described in 1963